Gigiri is a residential estate in Nairobi. It is home to Kenya's large expatriate community. It is one of the largest expat communities in Africa. 
Gigiri hosts:
United Nations Office at Nairobi making Nairobi the only African city to host several UN bodies i.e.
United Nations Environment Programme
United Nations Human Settlements Programme
Embassy of the United States, Nairobi 
The International Civil Aviation Organization's Base for Eastern and Southern Africa.

It also hosts The Village Market which is a large shopping, recreation and entertainment complex. Gigiri is considered one of Kenya's most posh suburbs along with Runda and Muthaiga which are located close by.

References

Populated places in Kenya
Suburbs of Nairobi